The Dune (original title: La Dune) is a 2013 French-Israeli drama film directed by Yossi Aviram.

Plot
A man without identity papers who doesn't speak a word is found on a beach of the Landes. A specialized inspector in the search for missing trying to unravel the mystery.

Cast

 Niels Arestrup : Reuven
 Lior Ashkenazi : Hanoch
 Guy Marchand : Paolo
 Emma de Caunes : Fabienne
 Moni Moshonov : Fogel
 Mathieu Amalric : Moreau
 Jean-Quentin Châtelain : Audiberti
 Dana Adini : Yaël
 Jean-Paul Larriau : Rigodot
 Lorenzo Santos : Reggiani
 Raymonde Bronstein : Madame Bertier
 Christian Ameri : Ferral
 Julien Villa : Eustache
 Tami Meiri Eitan : Yona
 Hortense Pol : Laetitia
 Shmil Ben Ari

Accolades

References

External links

2013 films
2013 drama films
French drama films
2013 LGBT-related films
French LGBT-related films
Israeli LGBT-related films
Israeli drama films
LGBT-related drama films
2013 directorial debut films
2010s French films